Gabriele Boscetto (25 September 1944 – 21 June 2021) was an Italian politician who served as a Senator and the  President of the Province of Imperia from 1995 to 2001.

References

1944 births
2021 deaths
Italian jurists
Italian politicians
Presidents of the Province of Imperia
Senators of Legislature XIV of Italy
Senators of Legislature XVI of Italy
Deputies of Legislature XV of Italy
Forza Italia politicians
The People of Freedom politicians
People from Como